Spring Bay is a village in Woodford County, Illinois,  United States. As of the 2010 United States census, the village population was 452, up from 436 in 2000. The village is part of the Peoria, Illinois Metropolitan Statistical Area.

Geography
Spring Bay is located at  (40.824261, -89.523330).

Demographics

As of the census of 2000, there were 436 people, 173 households, and 125 families residing in the village. The racial makeup of the village was 98.85% White, 0.46% African American, 0.23% Native American, and 0.46% from two or more races. Hispanic or Latino of any race were 0.69% of the population.

There were 173 households, out of which 28.3% had children under the age of 18 living with them, 57.8% were married couples living together, 9.2% had a female householder with no husband % of all households were made up of individuals, and 9.2% had someone living alone who was 65 years of age or older. The average household size was 2.52 and the average family size was 2.95.

In the village, the population was spread out, with 23.9% under the age of 18, 9.4% from 18 to 24, 31.0% from 25 to 44, 24.1% from 45 to 64, and 11.7% who were 65 years of age or older. The median age was 37 years. For every 100 females, there were 93.8 males. khn

References

Villages in Woodford County, Illinois
Villages in Illinois
Peoria metropolitan area, Illinois